Max Bunker, pen name of Luciano Massimiliano Secchi (born 24 August 1939), is an Italian comic book writer, and publisher, best known as the co-author of Alan Ford.

Bunker's career started in 1960 when he co-founded, together with his brother in law Andrea Corno, a publishing house focused on the production of comics called Editoriale Corno. In 1962 Bunker wrote a Western-style comic book, Maschera Nera (Black Mask). He went on to create more comics series in collaboration with Magnus (Roberto Raviola) such as Kriminal and Satanik and Maxmagnus. Bunker and Magnus' arguably most successful creative endeavour is Alan Ford. Originally published in May 1969, the series ran for 75 issues. When Editoriale Corno closed in 1984, Bunker founded Max Bunker Press and continued to publish Alan Ford in collaboration with other artists such as Paolo Piffarerio.

Selected works
 Kriminal (1964)
 Satanik (1964)
 Gesebel (1966)
 Maxmagnus (1968)
 Alan Ford (1969)
 Fouche (1973)
 Daniel (1973)
 Kerry Cross (1994)

Notes

Sources

 Max Bunker dossier FFF

External links
 Max Bunker Press official site

1939 births
Italian comics writers
Living people
Writers from Milan
Italian magazine editors
Italian publishers (people)
Comic book publishers (people)
Businesspeople from Milan
Italian magazine founders
20th-century Italian businesspeople
21st-century Italian businesspeople